The following is a list of football stadiums in Lithuania, ordered by capacity.

Current stadiums

Stadiums planned or under construction

Indoor stadiums

See also

List of European stadiums by capacity
List of association football stadiums by capacity
List of indoor arenas in Lithuania

External links 

 Stadiums in Lithuania

 
Lithuania
Stadiums
Football